The Lime Island Formation is a geologic formation in Michigan. It preserves fossils dating back to the Silurian period.

See also

 List of fossiliferous stratigraphic units in Michigan

References
 

Silurian Michigan
Silurian System of North America